The men's high jump at the 2016 European Athletics Championships took place at the Olympic Stadium on 9 and 10 July.

Records

Schedule

Results

Qualification
Qualification: 2.25 m (Q) or best 12 performances (q)

Final

References

High Jump M
High jump at the European Athletics Championships